The Catholic Church in Grenada is part of the worldwide Catholic Church, under the spiritual leadership of the Pope in Rome.

There are approximately 40,000 Catholics in Grenada—around 44% of the total population. The country forms a single diocese: the Diocese of St George's in Grenada, led by Bishop Clyde Martin Harvey.

References

The Catholic Diocese of St.George's in Grenada

 
Grenada